Besford is a village and civil parish in the Wychavon district of Worcestershire, England.

Besford may also refer to:

 Ted Besford (1915–1978), an Australian rules footballer
 John Besford (1911–1993), an English competitive swimmer

See also
 Besford Bridge, a village in Worcestershire, England